Falling Overnight is a 2011 American drama film directed by Conrad Jackson and written by Parker Croft, Aaron Golden, and Conrad Jackson. Falling Overnight stars Parker Croft and Emilia Zoryan

Plot
Falling Overnight tells the story of 22-year-old Elliot Carson (Parker Croft) on the day before he has surgery to remove a brain tumor. Facing what could be his last night, Elliot’s path intersects with Chloe Webb (Emilia Zoryan), a beautiful young photographer who invites him to her art show. Scared and alone, Elliot welcomes the distraction and as the night descends, Chloe takes him on an intimate and exhilarating journey through the city. But as morning approaches, and Chloe learns of Elliot’s condition, the magic of the evening unravels, and they must together face the uncertainty of Elliot’s future.

Cast
 Parker Croft as Elliot Carson
 Emilia Zoryan as Chloe Webb
 Barak Hardley as Toby
 Millie Zinner as Mel
 Jake Olson as Kevin
 Elizabeth Jackson as Samantha
 Nathalie Antonia as Eva
 Jérôme Charvet as Julian
 Christian Yeager as Jake
 Jon Michael Hill as Troy

Reception 
On review aggregator Rotten Tomatoes, the film holds a rating of 40% based on 5 reviews, with an average score of 4.9/10.

References

External links
 
 

2011 drama films
2011 films
American drama films
2010s English-language films
2010s American films